= Roamler =

Dutch information technology company

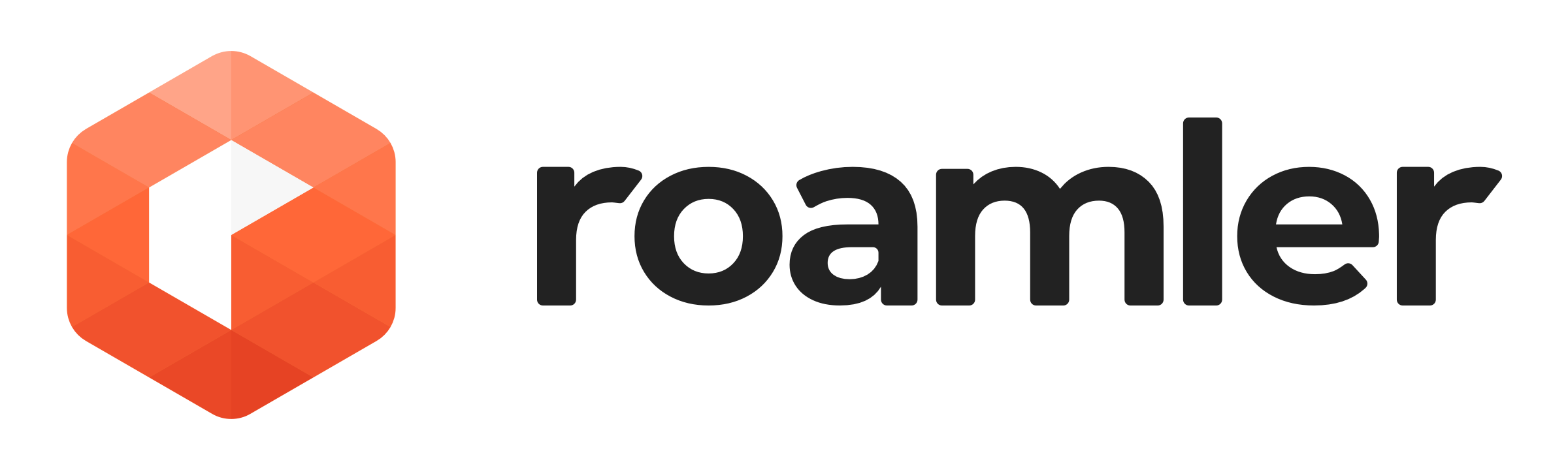
- Trade name: Roamler B.V.
- Industry: Information Technology
- Founded: June 19, 2011 in Amsterdam, Netherlands
- Founders: Wiggert de Haan; Martijn Nijhuis
- Headquarters: NDSM-Plein 20, Amsterdam, Netherlands
- Areas served: Europe
- Key people: Jeroen ten Haave (Group Chief Executive)
- Number of employees: 200 - 500
- Divisions: The Netherlands, Germany, the United Kingdom, Belgium, France
- Subsidiaries: Roamler Italia, Roamler Iberica, Roamler Turkey
- Website: www.roamler.com

Roamler is a Dutch information technology company which specializes in using crowd-sourcing for business in the Retail, Tech and Care sectors.

The company was founded in 2011.

On-demand professionals are called “Roamlers", and are recruited and organized according to skillset, experience and physical location before being matched to tasks.

Roamler's HQ is located in Amsterdam, and the company has offices in the UK, Spain, Germany, France and Belgium and licensed partners in Italy and Turkey.

== History ==
Roamler was founded in June 2011 by Wiggert de Haan and Martijn Nijhuis, two Dutch entrepreneurs.

In 2015 the company opened branches in the United Kingdom, Germany, Belgium, Spain and France and started partnerships in Italy and Turkey.

At the beginning of 2016, Roamler launched the Tech branch, as first Dutch company to apply the principles of crowd-sourcing to the professional home installations market.

In April 2016 Roamler completed a 4.5 million euro investment, co-founded by Endeit Capital, to expand its activities further. In 2020, the company received another 20M euros funding. In 2021, Roamler acquired two companies to expand services throughout Europe.

== Developments ==
Year	Description/Country
2011	Focus on retail sector Netherlands, United Kingdom
2013	International expansion Chile, Germany, Italy, Poland, Sweden
2014	International expansion Belgium, Colombia, France, Luxembourg, Mexico, Spain, Turkey
2016	Available for the Tech sector Netherlands
2018	Available for the Care sector Netherlands
2020	Received a 20M euros funding from Endeit Capital, Smartfin and Achmea Innovation Fund. Ranked among the top three fastest-growing scale-ups in Europe.
2021	Acquired Datlinq, a data company specialized in food service and food retail data. Netherlands
2021	Acquired Mobeye, a French company specialised in crowd-supported field marketing services. France

== System and Software ==
Roamler makes use of proprietary software for its front and back-end activities.

The Roamler app is available for both iOS and Android upon registration.

Users are ranked according to experience points and levels. In order to be able to perform paid tasks, a user must reach level 2.

The app also contains an instant message platform, through which users can communicate directly with the company support department.
